James Smith was an American baseball second baseman in the Negro leagues.  He played with the Detroit Stars in 1925 and 1930.

References

External links
 and Seamheads

Detroit Stars players
Year of birth missing
Year of death missing
Baseball second basemen